Sebastian may refer to:

People and fictional characters 
 Sebastian (name), including a list of persons and fictional characters with the name
 Saint Sebastian, a Christian saint martyred in the 3rd century
 Sebastian of Portugal (1554–1578), the sixteenth king of Portugal and the Algarve
 Infante Sebastian of Portugal and Spain (1811–1875), Infante of Portugal (1811) and Infante of Spain (1824)
 Sebastián (sculptor) (born 1947), artist based in Mexico
 Sebastian (French musician), stage name of French musician, composer, producer, mixer, engineer, vocalist and DJ Sébastien Akchoté-Bozović (born 1981)
 Sebastian (singer), stage name of Danish musician Knud Torben Christensen (born 1949)
 Sebastian (rapper), stage name of American rapper Garland Mosley, Jr., brother of Timbaland
 Sin With Sebastian (also known as Sebastian), German musician Sebastian Roth (born 1971)
 Mr. Sebastian, professional name of body pierce artist Alan Oversby (1933–1996)

Arts and entertainment

Films 
 Sebastian (1968 film), a British spy film
 Sebastian (1995 film), a Swedish drama film
 Sebastian (2017 film), a Canadian romantic drama

Literature 
 Sebastian (Bishop novel), the first novel of the Landscapes of Ephemera duology written by Anne Bishop
 Sebastian (Durrell novel), the fourth volume in The Avignon Quintet series by Lawrence Durrell
 "Sebastian, or, Virtue Rewarded", the name of an unpublished poem written around 1815 by the 9-year-old Elizabeth Barrett, later famous as Elizabeth Barrett Browning

Music
 Sebastian (album), 2006 debut album by Swedish pop/rock singer Sebastian Karlsson
 "Sebastian" (song), 1973 song by Cockney Rebel, from The Human Menagerie album

Places

Australia 
 Sebastian, Victoria, a town

United States 
 Sebastian, Florida, a city
 Sebastian, Ohio, an unincorporated community
 Sebastian, Texas, a census-designated place
 Sebastian County, Arkansas

See also 

 Saint-Sébastien (disambiguation)
 San Sebastian (disambiguation)
 Sebastianism, the belief that the sleeping king Sebastian of Portugal will return to save his people
 Sebastiane (1976 film), a 1976 Derek Jarman film in Latin about the saint